This is a list of members of the South Australian Legislative Council from 1973 to 1975.

 LCL MLC Henry Kemp died on 29 June 1973. John Burdett was elected to fill the vacancy on 11 August.

References
Parliament of South Australia — Statistical Record of the Legislature

Members of South Australian parliaments by term
20th-century Australian politicians